Wagon Knob is a summit in southern Lafayette County in the U.S. state of Missouri. The feature consists of a linear north-south oriented ridge with two summits.

Wagon Knob was named for a wrecked wagon left there.

References

Mountains of Lafayette County, Missouri
Mountains of Missouri